HD 127304 is a double star in the northern constellation of Boötes. The brighter component is a sixth magnitude A-type main sequence star with a stellar classification of A0Vs It has a faint magnitude 10.62 companion at an angular separation of 25.6″ along a position angle of 256° (as of 2013).

References

External links
 HR 5422
 CCDM J14298+3147
 Image HD 127304

Boötes
127304
Double stars
070892
A-type main-sequence stars
5422
Durchmusterung objects